Marissa is a feminine given name typically used in Western culture. It is a variation of Maris, which is Latin for 'of the sea'. It can also be spelled Marrisa, Merissa or Marisa. Marissa also means "little Mary" referring to the Virgin Mary.

People
Marissa Coleman (born 1987), American Women's National Basketball Association player
Marissa Delgado (born 1951), Filipino actress
Marissa Garrido (1926–2021), Mexican telenovela playwright and writer
Marissa Irvin (born 1980), American tennis player
Marissa Jaret Winokur (born 1973), American actress
Marissa Lingen (born 1978), American short fiction writer 
Marissa Mayer (born 1975), American business executive, President and CEO of Yahoo
Marissa Meyer (born 1984), American novelist
Marissa Mazzola-McMahon (born 1973), American film producer
Marissa Nadler (born 1981), American singer-songwriter
Marissa Ponich (born 1987), Canadian fencer
Marissa Ribisi (born 1974), American actress
Marissa Shen (2004–2017), Canadian murder victim

Fictional characters
Marissa Cooper, on the television series The O.C.
Marissa Faireborn, the main human protagonist from The Transformers series
Marissa Tasker, from the soap opera All My Children
Marissa Benson, from the sitcom iCarly
Marissa Morgan, played by Geneva Carr, from the television drama series, Bull
Marissa Schurr, played by Holly Deveaux, from the television series Hannibal
Queen Marissa, from the computer-animated film Barbie as the Island Princess

See also 
Marisa (given name)
Melissa (sometimes pronounced as a homophone in other languages)

References

English feminine given names